Acalitus is a genus of mites in the family Eriophyidae. These cosmopolitan, microscopic arthropods form galls on various plants, and some species such as Acalitus essigi and Acalitus vaccinii are pests of agricultural significance associated with berry crops. This genus includes the following species:

Acalitus acanthus Smith-Meyer, 1990
Acalitus accolus Flechtmann, Amrine & Stasny, 1995
Acalitus acnistii (Keifer, 1953)
Acalitus aethiopicus Smith-Meyer, 1990
Acalitus amicorum Flechtmann in Flechtmann, Kreiter, Etienne & Moraes, 2000
Acalitus amydros Flechtmann & Etienne, 2001
Acalitus ancyrivalis Smith-Meyer, 1990
Acalitus anthonii Keifer, 1972
Acalitus australis (Lamb, 1952)
Acalitus avicenniae (Lamb, 1952)
Acalitus batissimus Wilson, 1970
Acalitus bosquieae (Farkas, 1961)
Acalitus brevitarsus (Fockeu, 1890)
Acalitus calycophthirus (Nalepa, 1891)
Acalitus capparidis Flechtmann in Flechtmann, Kreiter, Etienne & Moraes, 2000
Acalitus carbonis Navia & Flechtmann, 1998
Acalitus carpatus Manson, 1984
Acalitus chimanemanus Smith-Meyer, 1990
Acalitus comptus Flechtmann in Flechtmann, Kreiter, Etienne & Moraes, 2000
Acalitus cotoneastri (Nalepa, 1926)
Acalitus cottieri (Lamb, 1952)
Acalitus crotoni Smith-Meyer, 1990
Acalitus dissimus Manson, 1984
Acalitus epiphytivagrans Mohanasundaram, 1983
Acalitus essigi (Hassan, 1928)
Acalitus excelsus Manson, 1984
Acalitus gilae Keifer, 1970
Acalitus gossypii (Banks, 1904)
Acalitus granulatus Flechtmann & Etienne, 2000
Acalitus gratissimae Smith-Meyer, 1990
Acalitus hassani Keifer, 1973
Acalitus heliopsis Keifer, 1975
Acalitus hereroensei Smith-Meyer, 1990
Acalitus hibisci Mondal & Chakrabarti, 1982
Acalitus intertextus Manson, 1984
Acalitus inulaefolii Keifer, 1970
Acalitus ipomocarneae Keifer, 1977
Acalitus khorixanus Smith-Meyer, 1990
Acalitus kohus Manson, 1984
Acalitus ledi Keifer, 1965
Acalitus longisetosus (Nalepa, 1892)
Acalitus lowei Manson, 1971
Acalitus lycioides Smith-Meyer, 1990
Acalitus macrosetosus Flechtmann & Etienne, 2003
Acalitus malelanus Smith-Meyer, 1990
Acalitus mallyi (Tucker, 1926)
Acalitus malpighiae Keifer, 1977
Acalitus maracai (Boczek & Nuzzaci, 1988)
Acalitus marinae Smith-Meyer, 1990
Acalitus meliosmae Mohanasundaram, 1981
Acalitus mikaniae Keifer, 1974
Acalitus morrisoni Manson, 1970
Acalitus notolius (Nalepa, 1919)
Acalitus odoratus Keifer, 1970
Acalitus orthomerus (Keifer, 1951)
Acalitus osmius (Cromroy, 1958)
Acalitus persicae Luo & Jiang, 1988
Acalitus phloeocoptes (Nalepa, 1890)
Acalitus phoradendronis Keifer, 1972
Acalitus phyllereus (Nalepa, 1919)
Acalitus plicans (Nalepa, 1917)
Acalitus prunispinosae (Nalepa, 1926)
Acalitus pundamariae Smith-Meyer, 1990
Acalitus purpurascensis (Cromroy, 1958)
Acalitus rapaneae Keifer, 1977
Acalitus reticulatae Mohanasundaram, 1981
Acalitus rubensis Manson, 1970
Acalitus rudis (G. Canestrini, 1891)
Acalitus ruelliae (Channabasavanna, 1966)
Acalitus sageretiae Kuang, 1987
Acalitus salvadorae Keifer, 1974
Acalitus santaluciae Keifer, 1966
Acalitus santibanezi Garcia-Valencia & Hoffmann, 1997
Acalitus schefflerae Mohanasundaram, 1981
Acalitus simplex Flechtmann & Etienne, 2002
Acalitus sogerctiae Kuang-Haiyua, 1987
Acalitus spinus Manson, 1984
Acalitus stenaspis (Nalepa, 1891)
Acalitus stereothrix (Nalepa, 1914)
Acalitus tanisetus Flechtmann, 1999
Acalitus tanylobus Smith-Meyer, 1990
Acalitus taurangensis (Manson, 1965)
Acalitus ueckermanni Smith-Meyer, 1990
Acalitus vaccinii (Keifer, 1939)

References

Eriophyidae
Taxa named by Hartford H Keifer
Trombidiformes genera